Ishq Vishk ( Love) is a 2003 Indian Hindi-language coming-of-age romantic comedy film starring Shahid Kapoor in his debut film performance, Amrita Rao, Shenaz Treasurywala, Yash Tonk, Satish Shah and Vishal Malhotra.

It is about Rajiv (Kapoor) and Payal (Rao) who are friends since childhood. While Payal is in love with Rajiv, it takes him a bit longer to return her feelings. The film became a success and launched both Kapoor's career and Rao's career. Internationally the film was distributed by UTV Motion Pictures.

Plot
Rajiv wants to be one of the popular kids of his college. However, due to the lack of a girlfriend, Danny and Javed mock him and his best friend Mambo. Javed and Danny plan a trip to Alibagh and invite Rajiv and Mambo to come along with girls. Since Rajiv wants to go on Alibag trip but has no girlfriend, Rocky advices him to date Payal for timebeing and dump her later and helps Rajiv woo Payal.

Rajiv decides to ask Payal, his reserved childhood friend, to become his girlfriend and tells her that he's in love with her. He does that only for the trip as he doesn't believe in love and serious relationships. Payal reciprocates his "feelings" and agrees, as she has been in love with him since their school days. Both of them start spending time with each other, and Rajiv finds out that Payal loves him.
Then comes the time for the trip, and by some persuasion, Payal is allowed by her father to go. Both of them accompany Danny, Javed, and their girlfriends and stay at Danny's beach house; however, misbehaves with Payal. Payal realizes that Rajiv doesn't love her and slaps him. After the midnight picnic incident, Danny and Javed's girlfriends try to clear the misunderstanding by making Payal understand that Danny was the reason for Rajiv's misbehavior at a drunken state, so Rajiv wasn't at fault. Rajiv doesn't accept her apology and asks her to kiss him in front of everyone. Payal refuses to say that she doesn't need to prove her love by doing such a cheap act. Their relationship falls apart, and Rajiv challenges that he'll have the college's most beautiful girlfriend. Rajiv's best friend Mambo, who was in support of Rajiv and Payal's friendly relation, does not like this and insists that he gets back with Payal. But Rajiv rebukes him.

Soon after, Alisha Sahay, a stylish and beautiful girl, starts at Spencer College. Rajiv is smitten by her and manages to woo her with the help of his friend Rocky. Meanwhile, Mambo and Payal become close, Mambo tries to cheer her up and always be with her. Payal still cares a lot for Rajiv and is silently hurt at seeing Alisha and Rajiv together. Nevertheless, she continues to talk to Rajiv and wishes him a happy birthday. Rajiv is taken aback because Payal and not Alisha bothered to wish him first, as Alisha is busy with her modeling shoot. Rajiv starts noticing that Payal and Mambo are coming close, which concerns him a lot. Rajiv is surprised to find Payal at his birthday party in a pub. Payal gets emotional and tells him she now thinks that her views about love were wrong, and that is why Rajiv is so happy with Alisha, something which was not with Payal. Mambo and Rajiv come to blows because of Payal, and Alisha slowly starts disliking Payal. The final straw is when Alisha sees Rajiv and Payal talking, and she learns from a mutual friend that they were together before she entered the college. She confronts Payal, behaves rudely with her, and accuses her of stealing her boyfriend. Mambo tries to defend Payal, and Alisha puts him off, which infuriates him. Rajiv and Mambo get into a big fight. Alisha and Rajiv leave with everyone accusing him of fighting with his friends. At Alisha's flat, Rajiv cannot think of anything else but how Payal loved him and let her go, and how after their break up, she still cared for him and the recent fight. Alisha gets insecure and keeps asking him to profess his love. He, imagining Alisha to be Payal, hugs her and says, "I love you, Payal."

At the Farewell party of the college, Rajiv apologizes to Mambo with a thought that Mambo was planning to propose to Payal. He then realizes his mistake as Payal still loves him, and Mambo was her friend. Rajiv tries to apologize to Payal, but she doesn't listen to him. Rajiv then takes the mic and publicly apologizes to Payal. He tells her he loves her a lot, even though she might not believe him. Payal is still angry with him and tells him that doing a drama in front of everyone and proclaiming his love will not make her relent. Rajiv stands before her and gazes pleadingly into her eyes. Payal is convinced that Rajiv does love her and embraces him. Alisha comes there and finds Rajiv and Payal dancing on a slow tune. She apologizes to Payal for her behavior and wishes them good luck. The movie ends with Rajiv and Payal's dance.

Cast
 Shahid Kapoor as Rajiv Mathur
 Amrita Rao as Payal Mehra
 Shenaz Treasurywala as Alisha Sahay
 Yash Tonk as Rocky
 Satish Shah as Mr. Vikas Mathur
 Vishal Malhotra as Mambo
 Upasna Singh as Kamlabai
 Neelima Azeem as Mrs. Ayesha Mathur 
 Vivek Vaswani as a Professor
 Omung Kumar as Host (Cameo)
 Anang Desai as Payal's Father
 Kapil Jhaveri as Javed
 Deepti Gujral as Dolly

Box office
According to Box Office India, movie collected approximately 122.63 million on a budget of 50 million.

Awards 

 49th Filmfare Awards:

Won

 Best Male Debut – Shahid Kapoor

Nominated

 Best Supporting Actress – Shenaz Treasurywala
 Best Female Playback Singer – Alisha Chinai for "Chot Dil Pe Lagi"

Soundtrack

The music was composed by Anu Malik. Lyrics were penned by Sameer. According to the Indian trade website Box Office India, with around 1,200,000 units sold, this film's soundtrack album was the year's eleventh highest-selling.

Track listing

References

External links 
 
 
 / Shahid and Priyanka in Ishq Vishk sequel 

2003 films
2000s Hindi-language films
Indian coming-of-age films
Films scored by Anu Malik
Hindi films remade in other languages